Endoxyla macleayi is a moth in the family Cossidae. It is found in Australia, where it has been recorded from New South Wales and southern Queensland.

The larvae have been recorded feeding on Eucalyptus species.

References

Endoxyla (moth)
Moths described in 1894